An Earth trojan is an asteroid that orbits the Sun in the vicinity of the Earth–Sun Lagrangian points  (leading 60°) or  (trailing 60°), thus having an orbit similar to Earth's. Only two Earth trojans have so far been discovered. The name "trojan" was first used in 1906 for the Jupiter trojans, the asteroids that were observed near the Lagrangian points of Jupiter's orbit.

Members

(leading)
 : A 300-metre diameter asteroid, discovered using the Wide-field Infrared Survey Explorer (WISE) satellite in January 2010.
 : Discovered by the Pan-STARRS survey in December 2020 and later recognized as an Earth trojan in January 2021.

(trailing)
 No known objects are currently thought to be  trojans of Earth.

Searches 
An Earth-based search for  objects was conducted in 1994, covering 0.35 square degrees of sky, under poor observing conditions. That search failed to detect any objects:
"The limiting sensitivity of this search was magnitude ~22.8, corresponding to C-type asteroids ~350 m in diameter, or S-type asteroids ~175 m in diameter."

In February 2017, the OSIRIS-REx spacecraft performed a search from within the  region on its way to asteroid Bennu. No additional Earth trojans were discovered.

In April 2017, the Hayabusa2 spacecraft searched the  region while proceeding to asteroid Ryugu, but did not find any asteroids there.

Significance 

The orbits of any Earth trojans could make them less energetically costly to reach than the Moon, even though they will be hundreds of times more distant. Such asteroids could one day be useful as sources of elements that are rare near Earth's surface. On Earth, siderophiles such as iridium are difficult to find, having largely sunk to the core of the planet shortly after its formation.

A small asteroid could be a rich source of such elements even if its overall composition is similar to Earth's; because of their small size, such bodies would lose heat much more rapidly than a planet once they had formed, and so would not have melted, a prerequisite for differentiation (even if they differentiated, the core would still be within reach). Their weak gravitational fields also would have inhibited significant separation of denser and lighter material; a mass the size of  would exert a surface gravitational force of less than 0.00005 times that of Earth (although the asteroid's rotation could cause separation).

Giant-impact hypothesis
A hypothetical planet-sized Earth trojan the size of Mars, given the name Theia, is thought by proponents of the giant-impact hypothesis to be the origin of the Moon. The hypothesis states that the Moon formed after Earth and Theia collided, showering material from the two planets into space. This material eventually accreted around Earth and into a single orbiting body, the Moon.

At the same time, material from Theia mixed and combined with Earth's mantle and core. Supporters of the giant-impact hypothesis theorise that Earth's large core in relation to its overall volume is as a result of this combination.

Continuing interest in near-Earth asteroids
Astronomy continues to retain interest in the subject. A publication
describes these reasons thus:

Other companions of Earth 
Several other small objects have been found on an orbital path associated with Earth. Although these objects are in 1:1 orbital resonance, they are not Earth trojans, because they do not librate around a definite Sun–Earth Lagrangian point, neither  nor .

Earth has another noted companion, asteroid 3753 Cruithne. About 5 km across, it has a peculiar type of orbital resonance called an overlapping horseshoe, and is probably only a temporary liaison.

469219 Kamoʻoalewa, an asteroid discovered on 27 April 2016, is possibly the most stable quasi-satellite of Earth.

Gallery

See also 

 2003 YN107
 2006 RH120
 3753 Cruithne
 6Q0B44E
 Claimed moons of Earth
 Kordylewski cloud
 Natural satellite
 Quasi-satellite
 Theia / giant-impact hypothesis

References 
 

 
Trojans
3